The 2017–18 season was FC Viktoria Plzeň's 25th season in the Czech First League. The team competed in Czech First League, the Czech Cup, the UEFA Europa League, and the UEFA Champions League.

Pavel Vrba returned to manage the club in the summer of 2017. He had previously served as manager from 2008 to 2013 before leaving to manage the national team.

Players

Out on loan

Transfers

In

Out

Loans Out

Pre-season and friendlies

Competitions

Czech First League

League table

Results summary

Results by round

Matches

Czech Cup

UEFA Champions League

Qualifying rounds

Third qualifying round

As a result of losing the third qualifying round, FC Viktoria Plzeň was moved to the play-off round of the Europa League.

UEFA Europa League

Qualifying rounds

Play-off round

Group stage

Knockout phase

Round of 32

Round of 16

Squad statistics

Appearances and goals

|-
|colspan="14"|Players away from the club on loan:
|-
|colspan="14"|Players who appeared for Viktoria Plzeň but left during the season:
|}

Goal scorers

Disciplinary record

References

Viktoria Plzen
FC Viktoria Plzeň seasons
Viktoria Plzen
Viktoria Plzen
Czech Republic football championship-winning seasons